Lethe mekara, the common red forester, is a species of Satyrinae butterfly found in India and Southeast Asia.

References

mekara
Butterflies of Asia
Butterflies of Indochina